Agustin Cazarez (born December 4, 1989) is an American soccer player.

Career
Cazarez played with USL PDL club Ventura County Fusion in 2014, before moving to USL Pro club Sacramento Republic on August 19, 2014.

Honors
Sacramento Republic
USL Cup: 2014

References

1989 births
Living people
American soccer players
Saint Mary's Gaels men's soccer players
Ventura County Fusion players
Sacramento Republic FC players
Fresno FC players
Association football midfielders
Soccer players from California
USL League Two players
People from Reseda, Los Angeles